Inola is also a spider genus (Pisauridae).

Inola is a town in Rogers County, Oklahoma, United States. It is included in the Tulsa Metropolitan Statistical Area (TMSA). The population was 1,788 at the 2010 census, a 12.5 percent increase from 1,589 at the 2000 census. Inola is a Cherokee word meaning "Black Fox." The town styles itself as "The Hay Capital of the World."

History
In 1889, the Kansas and Arkansas Valley Railway (later acquired by the Missouri Pacific Railway) built a line from Wagoner through the Foyil area on to the Kansas state line. The area was then just inside the northeastern corner of the Creek Nation in Indian Territory. A post office was established in March 1890 with the name Foyil. It was closed in September 1890, but reopened in April 1891. By 1901, the population was estimated at 100 people. The Dawes Commission had the town platted in 1902, before the Creek allotment.

Strip mines began producing coal nearby before statehood in 1907, causing a small boom in population. Inola's population was 405 in 1920. As the coal industry began to decline, so did the town's population. The 1930 census reported only 399 residents. The decline continued through the post World War II era, reaching 294 in 1950. A turnaround began in the 1950s as residents began commuting to Tulsa. Inola's population grew to 584 in 1960 and 984 in 1970. The 1980 census showed 1,550 residents, increasing to 1,589 in 2000 and 1,788 in 2010.

Geography
Inola is located at  (36.133182, -95.523938).

Demographics

Economy
The town has emerged as a bedroom community for Tulsa, about 28 miles to the west.

In October of 2020, tissue paper maker Sofidel opened a $360 million production factory in Inola.  The 1.8 million-square-foot plant includes a mill that transforms pulp into paper, and a conversion facility that makes the finished product.  The factory employs more than 300 people, and that number is expected to double with a second operational phase.

Black Fox Power Plant 

The Black Fox Nuclear Power Plant was a nuclear power plant proposed by the Public Service Company of Oklahoma (PSO) in May 1973. The facility was to be built approximately  outside of Inola, and encompass the use of two General Electric (GE) Boiling Water Reactors. PSO argued there would be great economic growth and better schools in the town. Many residents, as well as outsiders, were convinced it would be a dangerous to locate such a facility in their backyards. After nine years of court battles and minor earthquakes in the area, the decision was abandoned in 1982 and no complex was built.

References

External links
 - Inola Public Schools
 Encyclopedia of Oklahoma History and Culture - Inola
 Official Inola, OK website

Towns in Rogers County, Oklahoma
Towns in Oklahoma
Tulsa metropolitan area